Goodnight is a village in southern Polk County, Missouri, United States.  Located on Route 215, the community is part of the Springfield, Missouri Metropolitan Statistical Area. The population was 18 at the 2010 census.

History
A post office called Goodnight was established in 1883, and remained in operation until 1906. The community has the name of J. H. Goodnight, the proprietor of a local mill.  The village incorporated in 2003.

Geography
Goodnight is located at  (37.445833, -93.226667).

Demographics

2010 census
As of the census of 2010, there were 18 people, 8 households, and 5 families residing in the village. The racial makeup of the village was 100.0% White.

There were 8 households, of which 37.5% had children under the age of 18 living with them, 50.0% were married couples living together, 12.5% had a female householder with no husband present, and 37.5% were non-families. 37.5% of all households were made up of individuals, and 12.5% had someone living alone who was 65 years of age or older. The average household size was 2.25 and the average family size was 2.80.

The median age in the village was 40.5 years. 27.8% of residents were under the age of 18; 0.0% were between the ages of 18 and 24; 27.8% were from 25 to 44; 33.3% were from 45 to 64; and 11.1% were 65 years of age or older. The gender makeup of the village was 61.1% male and 38.9% female.

References

Villages in Polk County, Missouri
Springfield metropolitan area, Missouri
Villages in Missouri